Kavacham is a 2018 Indian Telugu-language action thriller film directed by Sreenivas Mamilla (his directorial debut). It stars Bellamkonda Sreenivas, Neil Nitin Mukesh (his Telugu debut), Kajal Aggarwal, Mehreen Pirzada and Harshvardhan Rane. Set in Vizag, the plot revolves around a police officer, who becomes a fugitive after being framed for a kidnapping, and must race against time in order to get his name cleared and catch the actual perpetrator.

Kavacham was released on 7 December 2018, and became a commercial failure. It was later dubbed in Hindi as Inspector Vijay in 2019.

Plot 
Inspector Vijay (Bellamkonda Sreenivas) saves a girl, Lavanya (Mehreen Pirzada), from goons and finds out she was going to elope with her boyfriend. He drops her at the rendezvous and, while waiting for her boyfriend, starts telling her about how he fell for Samyukta (Kajal Aggarwal), café waitress,  after she returned him his lost purse. In the meanwhile, he also fought and got a criminal named Ajay Bhupati (Ajay) arrested for kidnapping a girl. Back to his personal life, he was left heartbroken to learn about Samyukta's engagement.

Vijay takes the girl to his house after her boyfriend doesn't turn up. The next morning, finding out that her boyfriend cheated on her, Vijay drops the girl at a bus stop where they witness his mother (Kalyani Natarajan)'s accident. At the hospital, the doctor demands an unaffordable sum of 50 lakh rupees for the operation. The girl, revealing herself to be billionaire Mahendra Varma (Mukesh Rishi)'s niece, asks him to fake her kidnapping and demand 50 lakhs as ransom. She convinces Vijay that by doing this, she would also be accepted by her family members since no one would question her disappearance. Following the call, Mahendra's son Vikramaditya Varma (Neil Nitin Mukesh) informs the police and is accompanied by them to the rendezvous, where Vijay intelligently acquires the ransom without revealing his identity. He deposits the money at the hospital, following which his mother is saved. Vijay drops the girl at a bus stop and informs Mahendra about it. On his way home, he witnesses a car accident. Finding the driver severely injured, Vijay calls the ambulance and sends him to the hospital.

The next day, he learns that Samyukta is the actual niece of Mahendra Varma and that he has been framed for kidnapping her. Without revealing his identity, Ajay Bhupathi calls Vijay to tell him his game is over. With the help of his trusted Constable P. Sudarshan, Vijay locates Ajay and thrashes him but is shocked upon first learning he's not the kidnapper and then finding the corpse of the girl he had saved from goons. Upon being noticed, he is chased by cops but is rescued by Vaishnavi (Apoorva Srinivasan), Samyukta's friend. Revealing that Samyukta too loved him, she admits having lied about her engagement in order to test him. She also reveals Samyukta last called from a shopping mall. Through the mall's CCTV footage, Vijay learns of her kidnapping and, by tracing the kidnapper's vehicle number, finds him to be Aravindh, who lives at Aravindh Villa. Along with Vaishnavi, he goes to Aravindh Villa and, by looking at the pictures hanging there, realizes that Aravindh is the same man he had sent to hospital on the night of his accident. He had, however kept his phone with himself in order to answer if his family members called. Vikramaditya is revealed to be the conspirator when he calls on Aravindh's phone, and it's answered by Vijay who reveals the only mistake Vikramaditya made was to call him with the same phone Vijay had asked him to replace his own phone with, while acquiring the ransom.

Vikramaditya then reveals that Samyukta had decided to work as a café waitress in order to first understand the mindset of her customers, and since his father had chosen her over him to become his company's heir, he conspired to kill her. He first got her kidnapped and then got Vijay, as he loved her, framed for her kidnapping with the help of Lavanya, his girlfriend and the girl he had saved from goons. He also got his mother attacked in order to make him need money and thus execute the fake kidnapping. At the hospital, Aravindh is interrogated by Vikramaditya and reveals he couldn't kill Samyukta as she had tricked him into transferring all his money into her account. Leaving her in a secret chamber and following Vikramaditya's orders, he had gone to kill Lavanya, who in turn attacked him with a stone before getting killed herself. Injured, he couldn't drive properly and met with an accident. Vikramaditya kills Aravindh and informs Vijay about Samyukta's location while arriving at Aravindh villa himself to kill her. Vijay surprises him by revealing he had already rescued her and dropped Vaishnavi at a safe point, telling her to call the police. On his way to meet the commissioner, he learns that his mother has been taken hostage and, along with Samyukta, arrives on the spot where he fights off Vikramaditya and his goons, rescuing his mother and getting Vikramaditya arrested.

During the end credit scenes, Samyukta is declared the heir of S. company and confesses her love to Vijay.

Cast 
Bellamkonda Sreenivas as Inspector Bellamkonda Vijay, an honest police officer who gets accused of kidnapping Samyukta Chaganti
Neil Nitin Mukesh as Vikramaditya Varma, Mahendra Varma's son and Samyukta's cousin and kidnapper (Voice dubbed by Hemachandra)
Kajal Aggarwal as Samyukta Chaganti, Mahendra Varma's niece and Vijay's love interest who gets kidnapped
Mehreen Pirzada as Lavanya, a girl Vijay meets and saves and Mahendra Varma's fake niece and Vikramaditya's girlfriend
Harshvardhan Rane as Aravindh Vikramaditya's Henchmen & Main Kidnapper 
Posani Krishna Murali as Chintakayala Aavesam IPS
Mukesh Rishi as Mahendra Varma, Vikramaditya's father
Harish Uthaman as Sarath Chandra IPS
Kalyani Natarajan as Vijay's mother
 Apoorva Srinivasan as Vaishnavi, Samyuktha's best friend
Satyam Rajesh as Constable P. Sudarshan, Vijay's friend
Ajay as Ajay Bhupati
Prabhas Sreenu as Seenu
Prabhu as Doctor

Soundtrack 
The music is composed by S. Thaman.

Production 
Producer Naveen Sonthineni announced that he would produce Bellamkonda Sreenivas's next film under his newly created production house, Vamsadhara Creations. Kajal Aggarwal was cast as the lead heroine. Naveen Chandra was originally cast as the main antagonist for the film, but was subsequently replaced by Hindi actor, Neil Nitin Mukesh.

Release 

The film was released on 7 December 2018. It was also later dubbed and released in Hindi as Inspector Vijay on YouTube by RKD Studios on 28 April 2019.

Critical reception 

Kavacham received mixed reviews from critics.

Sangeetha Devi Dundoo from The Hindu wrote that "A sliver of a story lies buried under the painstaking efforts to create a star aura" and criticises the film's reliance on over used cliches.

Srivastan Nadadhur, from The Times of India, gave it a 2/5, stating that "Even if the story seems intriguing on a certain level, the filmmaker Sreenivas Mamilla seems more interested in making the hero wear smart tees, romance the ladies in scenic locations and have him thrash the goons to a pulp sequence after sequence." He wrote that "Kavacham should serve as an ideal reminder to Bellamkonda Sai Sreenivas that he needs to go beyond blazers, uniforms and abroad shoots to make a good film."

Manoj Kumar R from The Indian Express gave it a 1/5: "As far as the story goes, Kavacham doesn't have anything fresh to offer. It is just a star-vehicle that is intended to boost the young career of Bellamkonda Sai Sreenivas." He remarks that the heroines, Kajal and Mehreen, are not much more than "damsels in distress" and that the character of Neil Nitin Mukesh eventually "is reduced to nothing but a clown."

References

External links 
 

2018 films
2010s Telugu-language films
2018 action thriller films
Indian action thriller films
Films shot in Cambodia
Indian police films
Films about child abduction in India
Films shot in Andhra Pradesh
2010s police films
Films set in Andhra Pradesh
Films shot in Visakhapatnam
Films set in Visakhapatnam